Robin Arnold Smith (born 13 September 1963) is an English former cricketer.

Smith was nicknamed Judge or Judgie for his resemblance to a judge when he grew his hair long. Like his older brother Chris, he was unable to play for the country of his birth because of the exclusion of the apartheid regime from international cricket, but because he had British parents he qualified to play for England.

He played for England in eleven home test series and on six overseas tours from 1988 to 1996. Smith was best known for his abilities against fast bowling, with what was regarded as a trademark square-cut that was hit ferociously. He trained to be a psychologist.

County career
In county cricket, Smith played for Hampshire, captaining them from 1998 to 2002, before retiring from first-class cricket in 2003. He helped Hampshire to win the Benson and Hedges Cup in 1988 and 1992, and the NatWest Trophy in 1991, winning the man of the match award in the last two finals.

Until Kevin Pietersen (another English cricketer born in South Africa) was signed by Hampshire from Nottinghamshire in 2005, Smith was Hampshire's most successful England batsman since C. B. Fry.

International career

Early days
Smith was born in Durban, South Africa completing his high school education at Northwood School. The School honoured his career achievements by naming the 1st team cricket oval after him. In his first Test at Headingley in 1988, he shared a century partnership with fellow South African-born batsman Allan Lamb. This was one of very few century partnerships for England during the series against the firepower of the West Indies fast bowlers.  The following summer, 1989, Smith was the only successful England batsman in the Ashes series making two centuries. In his second hundred at Trent Bridge, he arrived with England already three wickets down chasing 600, and played some powerful shots – particularly off Mervyn Hughes whose bowling figures were, at one point 4–0–38–0.

Prominence
His highest test score, 175 against the West Indies in Antigua, was made as England replied to Brian Lara's record-breaking innings of 375. Despite his domination of fast, aggressive bowling, Smith suffered from a well-publicised vulnerability to slower bowlers. Although as ever he performed well against the opposition fast bowlers, his struggles against spin first came to prominence when he struggled against Mushtaq Ahmed in the 1992 test series against Pakistan and, then again in England's tour of India the following winter. In the one-off test against Sri Lanka that followed, he was promoted to open the batting so that he would face less spin bowling, and scored a century, his first test century overseas (all of his other test centuries to that point had come in England). Smith's most well-documented problems against spin, like many batsmen of his generation, came against Shane Warne who caused him significant problems in the 1993 Ashes.

Smith was one of England's most courageous players.  He was targeted by the West Indies at Antigua in 1989–90 with fast short pitched bowling giving him no room for his favourite shots.  During that innings, he was hit on the finger (subsequently diagnosed as broken) and hit flush on the jaw by a bouncer from Courtney Walsh – but neither blow forced him to retire hurt (although he did retire hurt in the second innings of the match).

Smith was part of England's Cricket world cup squad in 1992. He scored 167 not out for England against Australia in the 1993 Texaco Trophy at Edgbaston, when Australia won by six wickets. This was the highest score made by an England batsman in an ODI (until Alex Hales scored 171 against Pakistan in 2016), and was the highest score made by any batsman who finished on the losing side in such a game (until Charles Coventry scored 194 against Bangladesh in a losing cause).

Although he had mixed fortunes in terms of individual performance in test matches against Australia, the fortunes of his team in those matches varied strikingly little: England did not win any of the 15 test matches in which he appeared against Australia.

Later career
Despite this, when Smith was dropped from the England team it was popularly perceived as premature, particularly given his Test batting average of over 43. Backing this up is the ICC's historical rankings of Test batsmen, which placed Smith as the 77th greatest batsman in history, and 17th greatest Englishman (ahead of others such as Alec Stewart and Mike Atherton).

In 1994, before Smith scored 175 in the fifth and final Test against the West Indies, he was accused by the then England coach Keith Fletcher of "having too many fingers in too many pies."

Post-cricket
After retiring from county cricket at the end of the 2003 season, Smith relocated to Australia to help run helmet manufacturer Masuri. After suffering from mental health problems and anxiety, he currently works for his brother's clothing company and runs his own cricket coaching academy. Smith is also studying for a degree in psychological science at Swinburne University, Melbourne.

References

External links

1963 births
Cricketers at the 1992 Cricket World Cup
Cricketers at the 1996 Cricket World Cup
England One Day International cricketers
England Test cricketers
English cricketers
English cricketers of 1969 to 2000
Hampshire cricket captains
Hampshire cricketers
KwaZulu-Natal cricketers
Living people
Marylebone Cricket Club cricketers
South African emigrants to the United Kingdom
South African people of English descent
Sportspeople from Durban
Wisden Cricketers of the Year
Alumni of Northwood School, Durban